Arthur Ernst "Dutch" Meier (March 30, 1879 – March 23, 1948) was a professional baseball player who played for the Pittsburgh Pirates of Major League Baseball in .

Meier played college baseball at Princeton University.

References

Sources

1879 births
1948 deaths
Major League Baseball outfielders
Pittsburgh Pirates players
Princeton Tigers baseball coaches
Princeton Tigers baseball players
Baseball players from St. Louis